, also known as  was a Japanese martial artist. He was the founder of the Shinto Rokugo-ryū and Shinto Fuso-ryū schools of martial arts, as well as a scholar and popularizer of jujutsu through mail order marketing.

Biography
Noguchi trained kendo since his childhood with his father Nagashige, an instructor for the Dai Nippon Butoku Kai, and throughout his life he would add training in a variety of fighting styles, among them judo, sumo and multiple styles of jujutsu, such as Tenjin Shinyo-ryū, Kitō-ryū, Tenka Muso-ryū, Kiraku-ryū and Shinkage-ryū.

After graduating from the Tokyo Law School (predecessor to the current Chuo University), he worked in the Government-General of Taiwan before moving with his brother Shohachiro to open a martial arts dojo in Yūki, Ibaraki in 1898.

In 1908, Noguchi served as a hand-to-hand instructor in both Japan and the Japanese concession of Tianjin, China. On 24 May, he answered to a wrestling challenge by Mossel, a French soldier that was described as being larger than then-yokozuna Hitachiyama Taniemon. Mossel had previously defeated two black belt judokas, advantaged by not wearing a gi jacket, but Noguchi easily threw him thrice, after which he pinned and choked him out with kata-gatame. He also helped reviving Mossel by kappo, earning the awe and ovation of the crowd, after which no present wrestler answered to his own challenge.

In 1915, he traveled to San Francisco, United States, where he encountered catch wrestler Ad Santel in the ring on 30 November, in a match was hosted under the local rule of the best of three rounds. In the first round, Santel scored a takedown and pinned Noguchi, and although the Japanese attempted to work from the bottom, the stronger German ultimately shut him off and choked him out for the win. Noguchi attempted to come back at the second round, but again, Santel submitted him after ten minutes, winning the challenge.

Noguchi became the chairman of the Teikoku Shobukai in 1926, passing away five years later. Among his chief disciples were Daitō-ryū Aiki-jūjutsu exponent Mitsuru Sato, aikidoka Seito Tanaka and future judo 9º dan Harutsugi Kurosu.

References

1877 births
1930 deaths
Sportspeople from Tochigi Prefecture
Japanese jujutsuka
Japanese male judoka
Japanese kendoka